The 2014 McDonald's All-American Boys Game was an All-star basketball game that was played on April 2, 2014 at the United Center in Chicago, home of the Chicago Bulls. It was the 37th annual McDonald's All-American Game for high school boys. The game's rosters featured the best and most highly recruited blue chip boys high school basketball players graduating in 2014.  Chicago, which became the first city to host the game in back-to-back years in 2012, will continue to host the game annually at least until 2015. The rosters for the game were announced at 6:00 PM ET on January 29 on ESPNU. At the time of the announcement 22 of the 24 players had committed to Division I basketball programs. Duke and Kentucky led the field with four commits each. One of the game's major storylines was that local big men Jahlil Okafor (McDonald's Morgan Wootten Player of the Year) and Cliff Alexander (Naismith Player of the Year) opposed each other.

Rosters
The 2014–15 Duke Blue Devils (Tyus Jones, Justise Winslow, Okafor, and Grayson Allen) and 2014–15 Kentucky Wildcats (Karl-Anthony Towns, Trey Lyles, Tyler Ulis, and Devin Booker) shared the lead among committed players at the time of the original roster announcement on January 29. Three hometown players (Okafor, Alexander and Tyler Ulis) were selected for the game. Texas led the way with five natives (Myles Turner, Emmanuel Mudiay, Justin Jackson, Justise Winslow, and Kelly Oubre Jr.). Rashad Vaughn committed to UNLV on February 11, but Turner remained uncommitted at the time of the game. He committed to Texas 4 weeks after the game on April 30.

8 days before the game, Okafor was recognized as the Morgan Wootten Player of the Year. 2 days before the game, Grayson Allen won the slam dunk contest, James Blackmon, Jr. won the three-point contest and Tyus Jones won the skills competition.

East Roster

West Roster

Coaches
Frank Allocco (West Head Coach)
Brian Sullivan (West Assistant Coach)
Mark Noack (West Assistant Coach)

Lou Wilson (East Head Coach)
Dale DeBerry (East Assistant Coach)
Hank Lloyd (East Assistant Coach)

Results
The West defeated the East by a 105–102 score. Okafor and Justin Jackson earned co-MVP of the game after posting 17 points and 7 rebounds and 23 points and 5 rebounds, for their respective West and East teams.

Notes

External links

2013–14 in American basketball
2014
2014 in sports in Illinois
April 2014 sports events in the United States
Basketball in Illinois